Triaxomera marsica is a moth of the family Tineidae. It found in Italy, where it has only been recorded from the Parco Nazionale d'Abruzzo, Lazio e Molise.

References

Moths described in 1984
Nemapogoninae